Arlette is a Canadian political satire comedy-drama film, directed by Mariloup Wolfe and released in 2022. The film stars Maripier Morin as Arlette Saint-Amour, a fashion magazine editor who is invited by the Premier of Quebec (Gilbert Sicotte) to join the cabinet as minister of culture despite her lack of political experience; her unconventional approach to politics reinvigorates the public's engagement with arts and culture, but places her in the crosshairs of finance minister Paul Girouard (David La Haye), who wants to cut $100 million from her departmental budget.

The film's cast also includes Claudia Ferri, Patrick Caux, Sandrine Bisson, Lara Fabian, Alex Bisping, Paul Ahmarani, Alexandre Nachi, Benoît Brière, Alexandrine Agostini, Kathleen Fortin, Pascal Cameron, Daniel Gosselin, Sophie Caron, Gabriel Dagenais and Carmen Sylvestre.

The film opened theatrically in Quebec on August 5, 2022. It was also screened in France at the Angoulême Film Festival on August 24.

Production
Morin's casting in her first major starring role since having her career disrupted in 2020 by public accusations of verbal and sexual harassment fueled by cocaine addiction was controversial. Wolfe noted that the film had been in development for several years and Morin had already been cast by a previous director before the allegations became public, and stated that when she took over the project she auditioned several other actresses but felt that Morin was still the right choice. She further asserted that Morin's status as an actress trying to reestablish her career following a scandal fit in with the film's themes of an ambitious but inexperienced politician butting heads with the establishment.

Many scenes in the film were shot in the real National Assembly of Quebec.

Critical response
Anne-Frédérique Hébert-Dolbec of Le Devoir rated the film two and a half stars, writing that it was difficult to separate the film from Morin's public image issues.

References

External links

2022 films
2022 comedy-drama films
Canadian comedy-drama films
Canadian political satire films
Quebec films
French-language Canadian films
2020s French-language films
2020s Canadian films